Karlstein an der Thaya is a municipality and market town in the district of Waidhofen an der Thaya in the Austrian state of Lower Austria.

Population

Local council
Elections were held in 2015 with the following results:
ÖVP 13 seats
SPÖ 4  seats
FPÖ 2  seats

References

External links 

Cities and towns in Waidhofen an der Thaya District